Park Ridge Transit is an Australian operator of bus services in the southern suburbs of Brisbane. It operates nine urban services and nearly 70 school runs under the contract to Translink, Queensland Government.

History
In 1988, Park Ridge Transit was purchased from Greyhound owners the Penfold family by the Pulitano Group. In 2008 the Woodhill Coaches was purchased and integrated into Park Ridge Transit.

Routes
The company currently operates nine urban routes across Brisbane, Logan and Ipswich cities. They are:

Fleet
As at June 2020, the fleet consists of 94 buses.

References

External links
Translink timetables

Bus companies of Queensland
Public transport in Brisbane
Translink (Queensland)